Westlife is the debut studio album by Irish boy band Westlife. The album was released on 1 November 1999 through RCA. The album spawned the five UK number-one hit singles "Swear It Again", "If I Let You Go", "Flying Without Wings", the double A-side "I Have a Dream"/"Seasons in the Sun", and "Fool Again".

Background and release
Westlife signed to RCA in November 1998 and immediately flew to Stockholm to commence recording their debut album. Their lead single "Swear It Again" was released in April 1999. Two further singles followed and the album was released in November 1999. The album's standard edition features 17 tracks, while the band said they had recorded 22 songs for their debut album.

For North America, Westlife signed to Arista Records after auditioning for the label's founder, Clive Davis. Westlife released "Swear It Again" as their debut there on 7 March 2000. The album was released on 4 April 2000 with an altered track listing that included the new song, "My Private Movie".

A documentary video album related to the release, entitled "The Westlife Story", was released in October 2000, peaking at number 15 on the UK Visual Chart. The release, available in VHS and DVD, tells the story of how the five members became Westlife, the recording of their first album, and includes their then 4 music videos. On 26 June, 2000, the DVD was re-released, containing all their then 6 music videos, and on 18 November 2002, it was included in the five disc box set entitled Westlife: The Complete Story.

Commercial performance
Due to all five singles from the album peaking at number one on the UK Singles Chart in less than a year, Westlife created a chart history record that remains unbroken to date. Despite this, however, the album entered and peaked at number two, being beaten only by an extra 1,000 copies of Steptacular by Steps. The album was the biggest chart dropper on the top 40 in UK music history when, in its 58th week on the charts it leapt from No. 79 to No. 3 before falling to No. 37 the following week. Despite the history, the album successfully managed to peak at No. 1 in Scotland in the year 2001 after premiering at No. 6 at the Scottish Charts in 1999.

The album became the eighth best-selling album of 1999 in the United Kingdom, and ended up being certified 5× Platinum. The album went on to spend seventy-four weeks in the UK Top 100. 

In 2000, the album was released in the United States and debuted at number 2 on the Billboard Top Heatseekers and peaked at 129 on the Billboard 200.

The album also peaked at number 1 in Ireland and 15 in Australia. Westlife also remains the best-selling international album ever in Indonesia and Philippines, receiving 20× platinum certifications for over 1 million copies sold in Indonesia and 25× Platinum certifications for over 500,000 units sold in the Philippines.

Track listing 

Notes
 "Swear It Again" is also referred to as "Swear It All Over Again" according to music repertoires.
 "No No" is also referred to as "No No I Don't Need Nobody" or "No No (I Don't Need Nobody)" according to music repertoires.
 "I Don't Wanna Fight" is also referred to as "I Don't Want to Fight" according to music repertoires.
 "Miss You" is also referred to as "I Miss You" according to music repertoires.
 "Can't Lose What You Never Had" is also referred to as "Can't Lose What U Never Had" according to music repertoires.

Personnel

Charts

Weekly charts

Year-end charts

Certifications and sales

Release history

See also
List of best-selling albums in Indonesia
List of best-selling albums in the Philippines

References

1999 debut albums
Westlife albums
Sony Music albums
RCA Records albums
Sony BMG albums
Albums produced by Steve Mac
Albums produced by Cutfather
Albums produced by David Kreuger
Albums produced by Per Magnusson
Albums produced by Rami Yacoub
Albums recorded at Cheiron Studios